Pope Alexander VIII (r. 1689–1691) created 14 cardinals in three consistories.

November 7, 1689

 Pietro Ottoboni

February 13, 1690

 Bandino Panciatici
 Giacomo Cantelmo
 Ferdinando d'Adda
 Toussaint de Forbin-Janson
 Giambattista Rubini
 Francesco del Giudice
 Giambattista Costaguti
 Carlo Bichi
 Giuseppe Renato Imperiali
 Luigi Omodei
 Gian Francesco Albani

November 13, 1690

 Francesco Barberini

References

Alexander VIII
College of Cardinals
17th-century Catholicism